Game of Life (also The Game of Life) was an educational programme for teenagers, commissioned by the ABC and SBS in 1986.
The format was a compere (Mic Conway) would teleport seven youths to a disco in the opening credits, one of whom would be chosen as that episode's reporter.
Topic included leaving high school, sex and drugs. Mic Conway said, "It got a big response mainly from people who didn't like that it tackled "youth" issues like drugs, sex etc; just as families were settling down to dinner and the ABC news, so it was not taken up again."
The eight episodes screened from Thursday 3 April 1986 on ABC, and were repeated twice on both ABC and SBS

Episodes

Just Good Friends     (3 April 1986)
A Way to Play Peacefully     (10 April 1986)
I Feel Like I'm Thirty     (17 April 1986)
Education Doesn't Mean Nothin' To Me     (24 April 1986)
I Need a Job     (1 May 1986)
Hey Mum I'm on TV     (8 May 1986)
Youth Rules OK     (15 May 1986)
We Live for Love     (22 May 1986)

Credits

Reporters  
Mark Wooder  
Simon Peart  
Brett Thomson  
Angela Martinkus  
Lisbeth Kennelly  
Lisa Hensley  
Simon Njoo 

Compere: Mic Conway  
Miss Heroine: Denny Gordon  
Soap box orator: Ian Nimmo  
School teacher: Peter Carmody 

Directors: Michael Pattinson, Louise Meek, Hugh Piper, James Bradley  
Producer: Jim George  
Production research coordinator: Kris Wyld  
Production research coordinator: Judy Menczel  

Production companies: Communique Pty Ltd, Ultrafun Pty Ltd 
Distribution company: Communique Pty Ltd 
Working title: Youth in Australia '85

References 

Australian educational television series
1986 in Australia
Australian Broadcasting Corporation original programming
Special Broadcasting Service original programming